

This is a list of the National Register of Historic Places listings in Faribault County, Minnesota.  This is intended to be a complete list of the properties and districts on the National Register of Historic Places in Faribault County, Minnesota, United States.  The locations of National Register properties and districts for which the latitude and longitude coordinates are included below, may be seen in an online map.

There are 13 properties and districts listed on the National Register in the county.  A supplementary list includes one additional site that was formerly listed on the National Register.

Current listings

|}

Former listing

|}

See also
 List of National Historic Landmarks in Minnesota
 National Register of Historic Places listings in Minnesota

References

External links

 Minnesota National Register Properties Database—Minnesota Historical Society

Faribault County